is a tram stop on the Tokyo Sakura Tram.

Lines
Odai Station is served by the Tokyo Sakura Tram.

Railway stations in Tokyo
Railway stations in Japan opened in 1968
Arakawa, Tokyo